August Sedláček (28 August 1843 – 15 January 1926) was a distinguished Czech historian and archivist. 

Sedláček was born in Mladá Vožice, Bohemia.  Notably, he worked in medieval history, detailing the history of Medieval castles in the Bohemian Kingdom. He wrote among others extensively on autonomous region of Prachens in the southwest of Bohemia in 1926 (Děje Prachenského Kraje, Písek).

Bibliography
Hrady, zámky a tvrze království českého, 15 vols., 1882–1927.

External links
Extensive Biography 

1843 births
1926 deaths
People from Mladá Vožice
Czech archivists
19th-century Czech historians
20th-century Czech historians